Consulate General of Indonesia in Vancouver is Indonesia's diplomatic mission in Vancouver, British Columbia, Canada.

The consulate general provides consular services to Indonesians and foreigners in the provinces of British Columbia and Alberta, and the territories of Yukon and the Northwest Territories. The Consulate General's mission is to enhance economic relations in trade, investment, and tourism, and also to develop better interactions in all areas including information, social culture, and consular affairs between the Republic of Indonesia and all areas of its accreditation. As the representative of the government of Indonesia, the Consulate General also has the responsibility to protect and to provide assistance to Indonesian citizens in its accreditation areas.

The building is situated at 1630 Alberni Street, Vancouver, British Columbia.

History
Diplomatic relations between Indonesia and Canada were established on 9 October 1952 and, since then, relations between the two countries have grown closer and deeper. The Consulate of the Republic of Indonesia in Vancouver was officially opened on November 20, 1982. In 1993 it was upgraded to a Consulate General. The Consulate's first office was at 1455 West Georgia Street, Vancouver. On August 26, 1998, the Consulate moved its premises to its current address at 1630 Alberni Street, Vancouver, B.C.,V6G 1A6.

Before the opening of the Consulate, Indonesia's interests in British Columbia were represented by Honorary Consuls:

Mr. Leslie Thomas Gray (1962-1973)
Mr. Robert W. Lindsay (1973-1978)
Mr. Sidik Martohardjono (1978-1982)

Whereas the Consuls/Consul Generals were:

Mr. Abdul Aziz (1982-1986)
Mr. Eddy Sumantri (1987-1990)
Ms. Sukartini Sabekti (1991-1995)
Mr. Jacky D. Wahyu (1995 - 1998)
Mr. Marlis Syamsuddin (1998 - 2001)
Ms. Binarti F. Sumirat (2002 - 2004)
Mr. Bunyan Saptomo (2005 - 2008)
Mr. Bambang Hiendrasto (2010 - 2014)
Mrs. Sri Wilujeng (2015 - 2018)
Mrs. Tuti W. Irman (2018 - 2021)

Current Consul General and Senior Staffs
Hendra Halim begins his tenure as the Consul General in July 2021 and still remains in office.

See also

 Diplomatic missions of Indonesia

Notes

Buildings and structures in Vancouver
Diplomatic missions in Canada
Vancouver
Canada–Indonesia relations